These are the official results of the 2003 South American Championships in Athletics which took place June 20–22, 2003 in Barquisimeto, Venezuela.

Men's results

100 meters

HeatsWind:Heat 1: +0.5 m/s, Heat 2: -1.8 m/s

FinalWind:+1.2 m/s

200 meters

HeatsWind:Heat 1: +2.8 m/s, Heat 2: +0.8 m/s

FinalWind:-0.9 m/s

400 meters

Heats

Final

800 meters

Heats

Final

1500 meters

5000 meters

10,000 meters

110 meters hurdles
Wind: +1.5 m/s

400 meters hurdles

Heats

Final

3000 meters steeplechase

4 x 100 meters relay

4 x 400 meters relay

20,000 meters walk

High jump

Pole vault

Long jump

Triple jump

Shot put

Discus throw

Hammer throw

Javelin throw

Decathlon

Women's results

100 meters

HeatsWind:Heat 1: +0.5 m/s, Heat 2: 0.0 m/s

FinalWind:+0.2 m/s

200 meters

HeatsWind:Heat 1: +1.7 m/s, Heat 2: +3.1 m/s

FinalWind:0.0 m/s

400 meters

800 meters

1500 meters

5000 meters

10,000 meters

100 meters hurdles
Wind: -1.5 m/s

400 meters hurdles

3000 meters steeplechase

4 x 100 meters relay

4 x 400 meters relay

20,000 meters walk

High jump

Pole vault

Long jump

Triple jump

Shot put

Discus throw

Hammer throw

Javelin throw

Heptathlon

References

South American Championships
Events at the South American Championships in Athletics